The Meroka CIWS is a Spanish Navy 12 barrelled 20 mm CIWS, using twelve Oerlikon 20 mm/12 guns mounted in 2 rows of 6 guns each. The system's primary purpose is defence against anti-ship missiles, and other precision guided weapons. However, it can also be employed against aircraft, ships and other small craft, coastal targets, and floating mines. The weapon is mounted primarily on Spanish naval vessels, from frigate size upwards.

The term MeRoKa (from German Mehrrohrkanone, meaning multi-barrelled gun) can refer to weapons such as the Nordenfelt gun but is more commonly used referring to this naval CIWS defence system. The "Meroka" was developed and produced by the Spanish firm FABA Sistemas (Fábrica de Artillería Bazán).

Description  
Unlike a rotary cannon, the Meroka CIWS uses individual guns firing in salvos or simultaneously; the barrels are purposely skewed in order to expand the impact area. The guns are mounted in an enclosed automatic turret and are directed by radar or an optronic thermal controlling system.

The original version of the Meroka CIWS was directed by a separate off-mount radar system. This was later changed to an on-mount Lockheed Electronics PVS-2 Sharpshooter I-band radar. Later versions included an optronic targeting system, as a backup in high electronic jamming conditions. More recent modifications included an Israeli designed IR tracker and other electronic devices of Spanish design supplied by Indra Sistemas.

Specifications 
 Gun: 12 × Oerlikon 20 mm/120.
 Weight: .
 Elevation: -15° to +85°.
 Traverse: 360°.
 Muzzle velocity: .
 Rate of fire: 1,440 rounds per minute cyclic (for all twelve barrels).
 Ammunition: Fixed (APDS-T) 720 rounds in a magazine, 60 rounds per barrel.
 Weapons range: Effective range with APDS-T (0.102 kg with sabot), roughly 1,500–2,000 meters.
 Search and track systems: Lockheed Electronics PVS-2 Sharpshooter I-band radar, Indra Thermal Imager.

See also 
 Gast Gun
 Phalanx CIWS
 Volley gun

References 

 Naval Weapons of the World

External links 
 Spanish CIWS System Meroka 

20 mm artillery
Anti-aircraft guns of Spain
Naval anti-aircraft guns
Autocannon
Close-in weapon systems
Spanish Navy
Salvo weapons